Bernegger is a surname. Notable people with the surname include:

Carlos Bernegger (born 1969), Argentine-Swiss footballer
Marc P. Bernegger (born 1979), Swiss entrepreneur and investor
Matthias Bernegger (1582–1640), German philologist, astronomer, and writer
Nicole Bernegger (born 1977), Swiss soul singer